The A. Verville Fellowship is an American senior scholarship established in the name of aviation pioneer Alfred V. Verville at the Smithsonian Institution's National Air and Space Museum. The Verville Fellowship is a competitive nine- to twelve-month in-residence fellowship for researching the history of aviation.  The fellowship includes a $50,000 stipend with limited additional funds for travel and miscellaneous expenses.

The program guidelines encourage candidates to pursue research and writing programs that appeal to an audience with broad interests while maintaining a professional tone. Outstanding manuscripts resulting from this program may be offered to the Smithsonian Institution Press for publication.

Fellowship selections 
2014-2015 - Alexander C.T. Geppert
2012-2013 - Richard Paul - NASA's role in the civil rights movement
2011-2012 - Anke Ortlepp - Jim Crow Terminals: The Desegregation of Airports in the American South
2010-2011 - Monique Laney - Transnational Migration and National Memory: How German Rocket Engineers Became Americans in Huntsville, Alabama
2009-2010 - Debbora Battaglia
2008-2009 - Evelyn Crellin
2007-2008 - Richard Hallion, Topic: Role of NACA Technical Representative John Jay Ide in air intelligence and the transfer of technical information between Europe and America
2006-2007 - Christine Yano, Topic: Airborne Dreams: Japanese American Stewardesses with Pan American World Airways, 1955-1972 (Durham, N.C.: Duke University Press, 2011).
2005-2006 - Dennis R. Jenkins, Topic: Escaping the Gravity Well: A Policy History of Space Access
2004-2005 - Neil M. Maher Topic: Ground Control: How the Space Race Scrubbed the 1960s Revolution
2003-2004 - Adnan Morshed
2002-2003 - Asif Azam Siddiqi - The Red Rockets’ Glare: Spaceflight and the Soviet Imagination (New York: Cambridge UP, 2010)
2001-2002 - Dwayne A. Day
2000-2001 - Alan R. Bender
1999-2000 - Carl Bobrow
1997-1998 - Dik A. Daso, retired curator of military aircraft at the Museum, wrote Hap Arnold and the Evolution of American Air Power (Washington, D.C.: SI Press, 2000)
1996-1997 - John R. Breihan
1991-1992 - Harold Andrews
1989-1990 - Daniel Ford
1988-1989 - Michael J. Neufeld - Von Braun, Collier's and Disney: Selling Space in the 1950s
1987-1988 - William Chana

See also
Charles A. Lindbergh Chair in Aerospace History

External links
 National Air and Space Museum Research Fellowships - A. Verville Fellowship, Main Smithsonian page for fellowship

References

Awards established in 1987
Fellowships
Smithsonian Institution research programs
Scholarships in the United States
History of science awards